The Peru national under-16 and under-17 basketball team is a national basketball team of Peru, administered by the Peru Basketball Federation (Spanish: Federación Deportiva Peruana de Basketball) (F.D.P.B.).
It represents the country in international under-16 and under-17 (under age 16 and under age 17) basketball competitions.

It appeared at the 2015 South American U17 Basketball Championship.

See also
Peru national basketball team
Peru national under-19 basketball team
Peru women's national under-17 basketball team

References

External links
 Peru Basketball Records at FIBA Archive

Basketball teams in Peru
Men's national under-17 basketball teams
Basketball